Scott Warren Anderson (born 26 June 1968) is a former field hockey goalkeeper from New Zealand, who finished in eighth position with the Men's National Team, nicknamed Black Sticks, at the 1992 Summer Olympics in Barcelona, Spain. He was born in Oamaru.

References
 New Zealand Olympic Committee

External links
 

1968 births
Living people
New Zealand male field hockey players
Male field hockey goalkeepers
Field hockey players at the 1992 Summer Olympics
Field hockey players at the 1998 Commonwealth Games
1998 Men's Hockey World Cup players
Olympic field hockey players of New Zealand
Sportspeople from Oamaru
Commonwealth Games competitors for New Zealand